Rafi Sarusi (born January 15, 1981) is an Israeli footballer.

Honours
Israeli Second Division:
Runner-up (2): 2004-05, 2008–09

References

External links
 

1981 births
Living people
Israeli Jews
Israeli footballers
Maccabi Netanya F.C. players
Hapoel Nir Ramat HaSharon F.C. players
Hapoel Jerusalem F.C. players
Maccabi Ahi Nazareth F.C. players
Hapoel Acre F.C. players
Maccabi HaShikma Ramat Hen F.C. players
Maccabi Ironi Kfar Yona F.C. players
Association football defenders